Sir Charles Fraser Adair Hore (8 November 1874 – 23 January 1950), better known as Sir Adair Hore, was a British civil servant who was Permanent Secretary of the Ministry of Pensions between 1935 and 1941.

In the first quarter of 1912, in Kensington, he married  Elizabeth Miriam née Miers (born 1867), the widow of Jacob Isaac Belisha (born 1862), the parents of the child who became Leslie Hore-Belisha, 1st Baron Hore-Belisha.

References

1874 births
1950 deaths
British civil servants